Vladimír Novák may refer to:

 Vladimír Novák (judoka) (born 1948), Czech Olympic judoka
 Vladimír Novák (painter) (born 1947), Czech painter
 Vladimír Novák (skier) (1904–1986), Czechoslovak Nordic skier